Robert Davis Wooten (born July 21, 1985) is an American former Major League Baseball (MLB) pitcher who played for the Milwaukee Brewers from 2013 to 2015.

College career
Wooten earned a bachelor's degree in exercise and sport science from the University of North Carolina. During his playing days at North Carolina, the team advanced to three straight College World Series appearances from 2006 to 2008. In 2007, he played collegiate summer baseball with the Chatham A's of the Cape Cod Baseball League.

Professional career

Milwaukee Brewers
Wooten made his major league debut for the Brewers against the Colorado Rockies, pitching a scoreless inning. He emerged as a second setup man to closer Jim Henderson, along with Brandon Kintzler. Wooten usually pitched in the 7th inning, Kintzler in the 8th, and Henderson closed it out in the 9th.

Wooten didn't make the team out of spring training, but was recalled after Henderson (who was no longer the closer, but a setup man to Francisco Rodriguez) was placed on the DL with right shoulder inflammation.

Wooten was outrighted off the Brewers roster on May 28, 2015.

Atlanta Braves
Wooten was signed by the Braves in January 2016. On May 3, Wooten was released by the Braves. He resigned a minor league deal on May 22. He became a free agent after the season.

Cincinnati Reds
On December 20, 2016, Wooten signed a minor league contract with the Cincinnati Reds. He elected free agency on November 3, 2018. On January 4, 2019, he re-signed to a minor league deal with the Reds. Wooten announced his retirement from professional baseball on April 18, 2020.

Coaching career
On January 14, 2021, Wooten was announced as the pitching coach for the Chattanooga Lookouts, the Double-A affiliate of the Cincinnati Reds.

Personal life
Wooten is a Christian.

References

External links

North Carolina Tar Heels bio

1985 births
Living people
People from Goldsboro, North Carolina
Baseball players from North Carolina
Milwaukee Brewers players
North Carolina Tar Heels baseball players
Chatham Anglers players
Helena Brewers players
West Virginia Power players
Brevard County Manatees players
Huntsville Stars players
Nashville Sounds players
Peoria Javelinas players
Caribes de Anzoátegui players
Major League Baseball pitchers
Colorado Springs Sky Sox players
Gwinnett Braves players
Tigres del Licey players
American expatriate baseball players in the Dominican Republic
Louisville Bats players
Chattanooga Lookouts players
American expatriate baseball players in Venezuela